The World Muaythai Federation was formed in 1995 by the Professional Boxing Association of Thailand (PAT). The PAT is the only organization officially recognized by the Thai government. The WPMF was founded to promote and support Muaythai worldwide, including enforcement of its traditions, rules and regulations.

Current champions

Male world champions

Female world champions

See also

List of international sports federations

References

External links

Organizations established in 1995
1995 establishments in Thailand
Professional Muay Thai organizations
Sports organizations of Thailand
Organizations based in Bangkok